Barnesville is a ghost town in Marion County, Alabama, United States. Two churches still remain in the town. A scattered populace still occupies Barnsville.

A post office operated under the name Barnesville from 1855 to 1907.

References

Ghost towns in Alabama
Populated places in Marion County, Alabama
Ghost towns in the United States